The Pacific Tsunami Warning Center (PTWC) is one of two tsunami warning centers that are operated by NOAA in the United States. Headquartered on Ford Island, HI, the PTWC is part of an international tsunami warning system (TWS) program and serves as the operational center for TWS of the Pacific issuing bulletins and warnings to participating members and other nations in the Pacific Ocean area of responsibility. It is also the regional (local) warning center for the State of Hawaii. The other tsunami warning center is the National Tsunami Warning Center (NTWC) in Palmer, Alaska, serving all coastal regions of Canada and the United States except Hawaii, the Caribbean Sea and the Gulf of Mexico.

The PTWC was established in 1949, following the 1946 Aleutian Island earthquake and a tsunami that resulted in 165 casualties in Hawaii and Alaska.

The PTWC uses seismic data as its starting point, but then takes into account oceanographic data when calculating possible threats. Tide gauges in the area of the earthquake are checked to establish if a tsunami has formed. The center then forecasts the future of the tsunami, issuing warnings to at-risk areas all around the Pacific basin if needed.

Bulletins
Depending on the seismic data, PTWC will issue the following types of bulletins:
Tsunami Information Bulletin
At this time, though a threat exists, there is no evidence that a tsunami is making its way across the Pacific. 
Tsunami Watch
PTWC has determined the earthquake may very likely have created a tsunami and is advising parties to be alert as PTWC awaits tide data to support tsunami generation. A watch may be upgraded to an advisory or a warning.
Tsunami Advisory
PTWC has determined the earthquake has created a tsunami with strong currents or waves dangerous to those in or very near the water.
Tsunami Warning
PTWC finds conditions serious enough to issue immediate concern to parts of the Pacific. The message will include approximate arrival times for various parts of the Pacific.

Deep-ocean tsunami detection

In 1995, NOAA began developing the Deep-ocean Assessment and Reporting of Tsunamis (DART) system. By 2001, an array of six stations had been deployed in the Pacific Ocean.

Beginning in 2005, as a result of the tsunami caused by the 2004 Indian Ocean earthquake, plans were announced to add 32 more DART buoys to be operational by mid-2007.

These stations give detailed information about tsunamis while they are still far off shore. Each station consists of a sea-bed bottom pressure recorder (at a depth of 1000–6000 m) which detects the passage of a tsunami and transmits the data to a surface buoy via acoustic modem. The surface buoy then radios the information to the PTWC via the GOES satellite system. The bottom pressure recorder lasts for two years while the surface buoy is replaced every year. The system has considerably improved the forecasting and warning of tsunamis in the Pacific Ocean.

Final transmission
Local populations in the United States of America receive tsunami information through radio and television receivers connected to the Emergency Alert System, and in some places (such as Hawaii) civil defense sirens and roving loudspeaker broadcasts from police vehicles.  The public can subscribe to the RSS feed or email alerts from the PTWC web site, and the UNESCO site.  Email and text messages are also available from the USGS Earthquake Notification Service which includes tsunami alerts.

References

External links

US Tsunami Warning System
National Tsunami Warning Center
Northwest Pacific Tsunami Advisory
DART
How the US Tsunami Warning System works

Warning systems
Tsunami
Earthquake and seismic risk mitigation
Seismological observatories, organisations and projects
Disaster preparedness in the United States
Disaster preparedness in Oceania
1949 establishments in Hawaii